U.S. Bank Plaza may refer to:

 U.S. Bank Plaza (Boise), a high-rise building located in Boise, Idaho, formerly the tallest building in the state
 U.S. Bank Plaza (Sacramento), a  skyscraper in Sacramento, California, completed in 1991

See also
U.S. Bank Center (disambiguation)
U.S. Bank Tower (disambiguation)